Thanomsak Sithbaobay (born: April 5, 1965 in Maha Sarakham province) is a retired  Thai professional boxer, who challenged the world champion three times, but not successful like Chamroen Songkitrat in 1950s. His other ring names were Thalerngsak Sithbaobay (เถลิงศักดิ์ ศิษย์โบ๊เบ๊), Khaoyai Mahasarakham (เขาใหญ่ มหาสารคาม), Khaoyai Pitsanurachan (เขาใหญ่ พิษณุราชันย์).

Biography & career
Sithbaobay debut in 1985 and won the Rajadamnern Stadium (comparable to Thailand Champion) Flyweight Champion in 1986. Include won the OPBF in the same year.

Later when Khaokor Galaxy lost WBA Bantamweight Title to Filipino Luisito Espinosa in 1989. His manager, Niwat "Chae-mae" Laosuwanwat (same manager as the galaxy brothers) managed him challenge the championship against Espinosa on November 29, 1990 at Rajadamnern Stadium, Bangkok. But the results he was defeated by unanimous decision.

Until Khaosai Galaxy retired, the WBA Junior Bantamweight Title was vacant. He was encouraged challenge vacant against Japanese Katsuya "Spanky" Onizuka on April 10, 1992 at Tokyo Metropolitan Gymnasium, Tokyo. He was defeated again. 

He rematch to Onizuka on November 5, 1993 at Ariake Coliseum, Tokyo, but was defeated again.

On May 5, 1996 he fought in the elimination fight with rising star Sirimongkol Singmanasak for the winner was supported challenge WBC Bantamweight Title. He was knocked out just third round.

He fight the final with a loss to the Japanese Korean descent Tetsutora Senrima in 1998 in Kōbe, Japan. Then to retire in the end.

References

External links
 

1965 births
Living people
Super-flyweight boxers
Bantamweight boxers
Thanomsak Sithbaobay
Thanomsak Sithbaobay